Clémence Boulouque (born 25 June 1977, Paris) is a French scholar of political science and international relations specializing in Jewish and Israel studies, professor, journalist, and literary critic. She currently serves as the Carl and Bernice Witten Associate Professor of Jewish and Israel Studies in the Department of Religion at Columbia University in the City of New York.

Early life and education
The daughter of magistrate , her life was upended when her father was appointed an anti-terrorism judge in the aftermath of the wave of attacks of 1986, implicating Iran. Clémence Boulouque was only thirteen when her father, confronted with terrible political-media pressure, committed suicide on 13 December 1990. It is from this painful experience, revived by her presence in New York on 11 September 2001, that Boulouque's vocation for literature and novel was born. A graduate from the Paris Institute of Political Studies and the ESSEC, Boulouque spent some time in a recruiting firm before moving to New York for the first time in order to do a master's degree in international relations at Columbia University in 2001–2002.

Career 
Back in France after New York, she devoted herself to writing, journalism, and literary criticism from 2002 to 2007.

In 2003, she wrote her first story, Mort d'un silence, in which she tells the long ordeal that she and her family lived when her father committed suicide.

She wrote in particular in Le Figaro littéraire, Transfuge and also in Lire. She regularly intervened as a chronicler in the program  by Arnaud Laporte on France Culture. She was the producer of the series of programs such as À voix nue with Toni Morrison or Amos Oz, as well as a summer series about Marguerite Yourcenar.
 
In 2005, William Karel made the film adaptation: La Fille du juge. This documentary mixed:
 Archive footage of programs and newscasts ;
 Photos and family movies shot in Super 8 by judge Boulouque ;
 Scenes shot in New York City and featuring the young novelist in person (at 28). The voice-over which "expresses" the words of Clemence, is that of the actress Elsa Zylberstein whom Karel met on the shooting of Van Gogh by Maurice Pialat.

She returned to the United States in 2008 and was awarded a PhD in Jewish Studies and History from New York University in 2014. Boulouque completed her postdoctoral training at the University of Pennsylvania's Katz Center for Advanced Judaic Studies, and she currently teaches in the Department of Religion at Columbia University as Carl and Bernice Witten Assistant Professor of Jewish and Israel Studies. Her courses of instruction include Religion and the Movies as well as Masterpieces of Western Literature and Philosophy.

Main works 
2003: Mort d'un silence, narrative, Éditions Gallimard, Crowned by the prix Fénéon ; Adaptation in documentary film in 2005 by director William Karel under the title La Fille du juge, which was nominated for the 2007 César Award in the documentaries category
2004: Sujets libres, novel
2004: Le Goût de Tanger, Mercure de France,  
2005: Chasse à courre, novel, Gallimard,  
2005: Juives d'Afrique du Nord, with Nicole Serfaty,  
2005: Au pays des macarons, Mercure de France,  
2007: [http://www.babelio.com/livres/Boulouque-Nuit-ouverte/40642 Nuit ouverte'], novel, Flammarion,  
2008: Survivre et vivre : entretiens avec Clémence Boulouque : la fille d'Irène Némirovsky témoigne, Denoël,  ;
2011: L’Amour et des poussières, novel, Gallimard,  
2013: Je n’emporte rien du monde, Gallimard, 

References

 External links 
 Clémence Boulouque on Babelio
 Clémence Boulouque ou la désolation féconde on Le Point (18 January 2013)
 "La Fille du juge" : la petite musique douloureuse de Clémence Boulouque on Le Monde (3 March 2006)
 Clémence Boulouque, romancière française on RFI
 Clémence Boulouque, écrivain en quête du sens de nos existences on La Croix (7 August 2015)
 Clémence Boulouque on ELLE''
 Le voyage initiatique de Jacob on 
 Columbia University page

1977 births
20th-century French journalists
20th-century French women writers
21st-century French journalists
21st-century French women writers
Academics from Paris
Columbia University faculty
ESSEC Business School alumni
French expatriates in the United States
French international relations scholars
French literary critics
French political scientists
French religion academics
French women academics
French women journalists
French women literary critics
French women writers
Fulbright alumni
Historians of Israel
Historians of Jews and Judaism
Judaic scholars
Living people
New York University alumni
Prix Fénéon winners
School of International and Public Affairs, Columbia University alumni
Sciences Po alumni
University of Pennsylvania alumni
Writers from Paris